The year 543 BC was a year of the pre-Julian Roman calendar. In the Roman Empire, it was known as year 211  Ab urbe condita. The denomination 543 BC for this year has been used since the early medieval period, when the Anno Domini calendar era became the prevalent method in Europe for naming years.

Events
 North Indian Prince Vijaya invades Ceylon and establishes a Sinhalese dynasty after he was banished from his father's kingdom
 Pisistratus, tyrant of Athens, purifies the island of Delos. (approximate)
 Guided by Chinese statesman Zi Chan, the State of Zheng institutes a formal code of law.

Births

Deaths
 Gautama Buddha Mahaparinibbana (traditional in Thailand and elsewhere - basis of Thai solar calendar)

References

 
540s BC